The opponent process is a color theory that states that the human visual system interprets information about color by processing signals from photoreceptor cells in an antagonistic manner. The opponent-process theory suggests that there are three opponent channels, each comprising an opposing color pair: red versus green, blue versus yellow, and black versus white (luminance). The theory was first proposed in 1892 by the German physiologist Ewald Hering.

Color theory

Complementary colors

When staring at a bright color for a while (e.g. red), then looking away at a white field, an afterimage is perceived, such that the original color will evoke its complementary color (green, in the case of red input). When complementary colors are combined or mixed, they "cancel each other out" and become neutral (white or gray). That is, complementary colors are never perceived as a mixture; there is no "greenish red" or "yellowish blue", despite claims to the contrary. The strongest color contrast a color can have is its complementary color. Complementary colors may also be called "opposite colors" and are understandably the basis of the colors used in the opponent process theory.

Unique hues

The colors that define the extremes for each opponent channel are called unique hues, as opposed to composite (mixed) hues. Ewald Hering first defined the unique hues as red, green, blue, and yellow, and based them on the concept that these colors could not be simultaneously perceived. For example, a color cannot appear both red and green. These definitions have been experimentally refined and are represented today by average hue angles of 353° (carmine-red), 128° (cobalt green), 228° (cobalt blue), 58° (yellow).

Unique hues can differ between individuals and are often used in psychophysical research to measure variations in color perception due to color-vision deficiencies or color adaptation. While there is considerable inter-subject variability when defining unique hues experimentally, an individual's unique hues are very consistent, to within a few nanometers.

Physiological basis

Relation to LMS color space

Though the trichromatic and opponent processes theories were initially thought to be at odds, it was later shown that the mechanisms responsible for the opponent process receive signals from the three types of cones predicted by the trichromatic theory and process them at a more complex level.

Most humans have three different cone cells in their retinas that facilitate trichromatic color vision. Colors are determined by the proportional excitation of these three cone types, i.e. their quantum catch. The levels of excitation of each cone type are the parameters that define LMS color space. To calculate the opponent process tristimulus values from the LMS color space, the cone excitations must be compared:
 The luminous opponent channel is equal to the sum of all three cone cells (plus the rod cells in some conditions).
 The red–green opponent channel is equal to the difference of the L- and M-cones.
 The blue–yellow opponent channel is equal to the difference of the S-cone and the sum of the L- and M-cones.

Neurological basis

After the cones, the neurological "conversion" to the opponent theory involves two other types of cells: bipolar cells, and ganglion cells. Information from the cones is passed to the bipolar cells in the retina, which may be the cells in the opponent process that transform the information from cones.

The information is then passed to ganglion cells, of which there are two major classes: magnocellular, or large-cell layers, and parvocellular, or small-cell layers.  Parvocellular cells, or P cells, handle the majority of information about color and fall into two groups: one that processes information about differences between the firing of L and M cones, and one that processes differences between S cones and a combined signal from both L and M cones.  The first subtype of cells is responsible for processing red–green differences, and the second process blue–yellow differences. P cells also transmit information about the intensity of light (how much of it there is) due to their receptive fields.

Advantage
Transmitting information in opponent channel color space is advantageous over transmitting it in LMS color space ("raw" signals from each cone type). There is some overlap in the wavelengths of light to which the three types of cones (L for long-wave, M for medium-wave, and S for short-wave light) respond, so it is more efficient for the visual system (from a perspective of dynamic range) to record differences between the responses of cones, rather than each type of cone's individual response.

Color blindness

Color blindness can be classified by the cone cell that is affected (protan, deutan, tritan) or by the opponent channel that is affected (red–green or blue–yellow). In either case, the channel can be either inactive (in the case of dichromacy) or have a lower dynamic range (in the case of anomalous trichromacy). For example, individuals with deuteranopia see little difference between the red and green unique hues.

History
Johann Wolfgang von Goethe first studied the physiological effect of opposed colors in his Theory of Colours in 1810. Goethe arranged his color wheel symmetrically "for the colours diametrically opposed to each other in this diagram are those which reciprocally evoke each other in the eye. Thus, yellow demands purple; orange, blue; red, green; and vice versa: Thus again all intermediate gradations reciprocally evoke each other."

Ewald Hering proposed opponent color theory in 1892. He thought that the colors red, yellow, green, and blue are special in that any other color can be described as a mix of them, and that they exist in opposite pairs.  That is, either red or green is perceived and never greenish-red: Even though yellow is a mixture of red and green in the RGB color theory, the eye does not perceive it as such.

Hering's new theory ran counter to the prevailing Young–Helmholtz theory (trichromatic theory), first proposed by Thomas Young in 1802 and developed by Hermann von Helmholtz in 1850. The two theories seemed irreconcilable until 1925 when Erwin Schrödinger was able to reconcile the two theories and show that they can be complementary.

Validation
In 1957, Leo Hurvich and Dorothea Jameson provided psychophysical validation for Hering's theory. Their method was called hue cancellation. Hue cancellation experiments start with a color (e.g. yellow) and attempt to determine how much of the opponent color (e.g. blue) of one of the starting color's components must be added to reach the neutral point.

In 1959, Gunnar Svaetichin and MacNichol recorded from the retina of fish and reported of three distinct types of cells:
 One cell responded with hyperpolarization to all light stimuli regardless of wavelength and was termed a luminosity cell.
 Another cell responded with hyperpolarization at short wavelengths and with depolarization at mid-to-long wavelengths. This was termed a chromaticity cell.
 A third cell - also a chromaticity cell - responded with hyperpolarization at fairly short wavelengths, peaking about 490 nm, and with depolarization at wavelengths longer than about 610 nm.
Svaetichin and MacNichol called the chromaticity cells Yellow-Blue and Red-Green opponent color cells.

Similar chromatically or spectrally opposed cells, often incorporating spatial-opponency (e.g. red "on" center and green "off" surround), were found in the vertebrate retina and lateral geniculate nucleus (LGN) through the 1950s and 1960s by De Valois et al., Wiesel and Hubel, and others.

Following Gunnar Svaetichin's lead, the cells were widely called opponent color cells: Red-Green and Yellow-Blue. Over the next three decades, spectrally opposed cells continued to be reported in primate retina and LGN. A variety of terms are used in the literature to describe these cells, including chromatically opposed or -opponent, spectrally opposed or -opponent, opponent colour, colour opponent, opponent response, and simply, opponent cell.

In other fields

Others have applied the idea of opposing stimulations beyond visual systems, described in the article on opponent-process theory. In 1967, Rod Grigg extended the concept to reflect a wide range of opponent processes in biological systems. In 1970, Solomon and Corbit expanded Hurvich and Jameson's general neurological opponent process model to explain emotion, drug addiction, and work motivation.

Applications
The opponent color theory can be applied to computer vision and implemented as the Gaussian color model and the natural-vision-processing model.

Criticism and the complementary color cells
Much controversy exists over whether opponent-processing theory is the best way to explain color vision. A few experiments have been conducted involving image stabilization (where one experiences border loss) that produced results that suggest participants have seen “impossible” colors, or color combinations humans should not be able to see under the opponent-processing theory. However, many criticize that this result may just be illusionary experiences. Critics and researchers have instead started to turn to explain color vision through references to retinal mechanisms, rather than opponent processing, which happens in the brain's visual cortex.

As recordings from single cell accumulated, it became clear to many physiologists and psychophysicists that opponent colors did not satisfactorily account for single cell spectrally opposed responses. For instance, Jameson and D’Andrade analyzed opponent-colors theory and found the unique hues did not match the spectrally opposed responses. De Valois himself summed it up: “Although we, like others, were most impressed with finding opponent cells, in accord with Hering’s suggestions, when the Zeitgeist at the time was strongly opposed to the notion, the earliest recordings revealed a discrepancy between the Hering-Hurvich-Jameson opponent perceptual channels and the response characteristics of opponent cells in the macaque lateral geniculate nucleus.” Valberg recalls that “it became common among neurophysiologists to use colour terms when referring to opponent cells as in the notations ‘red-ON cells’, ‘green-OFF cells’ .... In the debate .... some psychophysicists were happy to see what they believed to be opponency confirmed at an objective, physiological level. Consequently, little hesitation was shown in relating the unique and polar color pairs directly to cone opponency. Despite evidence to the contrary .... textbooks have, up to this day, repeated the misconception of relating unique hue perception directly to peripheral cone opponent processes. The analogy with Hering's hypothesis has been carried even further so as to imply that each color in the opponent pair of unique colors could be identified with either excitation or inhibition of one and the same type of opponent cell.” Webster et al. and Wuerger et al. have conclusively re-affirmed that single cell spectrally opposed responses do not align with unique-hue opponent colors.

More recent experiments show that the relationship between the responses of single "color-opponent" cells and perceptual color opponency is even more complex than supposed. Experiments by Zeki et al., using the Land Color Mondrian, have shown that when normal observers view, for example, a green surface which is part of a multi-colored scene and which reflects more green than red light it looks green and its after-image is magenta. But when the same green surface reflects more red than green light, it still looks green (because of the operation of color constancy mechanisms) and its after image is still perceived as magenta. This is true also of other colors and may be summarized by saying that, just as surfaces retain their color categories in spite of wide-ranging fluctuations in the wavelength-energy composition of the light reflected from them, the color of the after-image produced by viewing surfaces also retains its color category and is therefore also independent of the wavelength-energy composition of the light reflected from the patch being viewed.  There is, in other words, a constancy to the colors of after images. This serves to emphasize further the need to search more deeply into the relationship between the responses of single opponent cells and perceptual color opponency on the one hand and the need for a better understanding of whether physiological opponent processes generate perceptual opponent colors or whether the latter are generated after colors are generated.

In 2013, Pridmore argued that most Red-Green cells reported in the literature in fact code the Red-Cyan colors. Thus, the cells are coding complementary colors instead of opponent colors. Pridmore reported also of Green-Magenta cells in the retina and V1. He thus argued that the Red-Green and Blue-Yellow cells should be instead called  "Green-magenta", "Red-cyan" and "Blue-yellow" complementary cells. An example of the complementary process can be experienced by staring at a red (or green) square for forty seconds, and then immediately looking at a white sheet of paper. The observer then perceives a cyan (or magenta) square on the blank sheet. This complementary color afterimage is more easily explained by the trichromatic color theory (Young–Helmholtz theory) than the traditional RYB color theory; in the opponent-process theory, fatigue of pathways promoting red produce the illusion of a cyan square.

See also 
 Impossible color
 Lab color space
 Natural Color System
 Complementary colors
 Afterimage

References

Further reading 

 
 
 
 
 
 
 
 

Color vision
Image processing
Vision
1892 introductions